Pitfall! (stylized as PITFALL!) is an endless runner video game in the Pitfall! series, developed by British developer The Blast Furnace and published by Activision for iOS and Android in 2012. The latter version was released to coincide with the 2012 phenomenon's supposed Mayan apocalypse.

Overview
The gameplay and theme are similar to the Temple Run series, with the main character Pitfall Harry attempting to evade the constant eruptions of an active volcano through an endless jungle on foot and sometimes on a motorcycle.

Reception

The iOS version received "average" reviews according to the review aggregation website Metacritic.

References

External links
 

2012 video games
Activision games
Android (operating system) games
Endless runner games
IOS games
Pitfall!
Single-player video games
Video games developed in the United States